Similarities is a compilation album by Scottish band Biffy Clyro, released in Germany on 18 July 2014, in the UK and Europe on 21 July, and in the US and Australia on 5 August. Available on 12" double vinyl, CD (Limited to 3,000 copies and exclusive to the Biffy Clyro webstore) and as a digital download.

The album features B-sides (and one previously unreleased track) from the band's sixth album, Opposites.

Track listing

Personnel
Produced by: Biffy Clyro
Mixed by: Ben Kaplan
Mastered by: Frank Arkwright and Miles Showell at Abbey Road Studios
Design and Photography by: Stormstudios

References

External links
Official website

Biffy Clyro albums
2014 compilation albums
B-side compilation albums